The 1985 Langs Supreme Scottish Masters was a professional non-ranking snooker tournament that took place between 19 and 22 September 1985 at the Hospitality Inn in Glasgow, Scotland. Total prize money was £31,000 with a first prize of £10,500.

Cliff Thorburn won the tournament by defeating Willie Thorne 9–7 in the final. Thorburn also won the high break prize of £500 for his break of 142 in the semi-finals against Silvino Francisco.

Tournament draw

References

1985
Masters
Scottish Masters
Scottish Masters